The 1941 Washington Homestead Grays baseball team represented the Washington Homestead Grays in the Negro National League (NNL) during the 1941 baseball season. The team compiled a 51–24–2 record and won the NNL pennant.

Vic Harris was the team's player-manager. The team played its home games at Forbes Field in Pittsburgh and Griffith Stadium in Washington, D.C. 

The team's leading batters were:
 Third baseman Jud Wilson - .426 batting average, .606 slugging percentage in 30 games
 First baseman Buck Leonard - .348 batting average, .683 slugging percentage, 11 home runs, 40 RBIs in 47 games
 Third baseman Howard Easterling - .314 batting average, .483 slugging percentage in 45 games

The team's leading pitchers were Ray Brown (11–6, 2.92 ERA, 53 strikeouts) and Terris McDuffie (9–3, 2.43 ERA).

References

1941 in sports in Pennsylvania
Negro league baseball seasons